Michelangelo Galioto (21 March 1897, Bagheria - 16 April 1977) was an Italian politician. He represented the Labour Democratic Party (from 1946 to 1947) and the Italian Liberal Party (from 1947 to 1948) in the Constituent Assembly of Italy.

References

1897 births
1977 deaths
People from Bagheria
Labour Democratic Party politicians
Italian Liberal Party politicians
20th-century Italian politicians
Members of the Constituent Assembly of Italy
Politicians from the Province of Palermo